In enzymology, a 3'-demethylstaurosporine O-methyltransferase is an enzyme that catalyzes the chemical reaction

S-adenosyl-L-methionine + 3'-demethylstaurosporine  S-adenosyl-L-homocysteine + staurosporine

Thus, the two substrates of this enzyme are S-adenosyl methionine and 3'-demethylstaurosporine, whereas its two products are S-adenosylhomocysteine and staurosporine.

This enzyme belongs to the family of transferases, specifically those transferring one-carbon group methyltransferases.  The systematic name of this enzyme class is S-adenosyl-L-methionine:3'-demethylstaurosporine O-methyltransferase. Other names in common use include 3'-demethoxy-3'-hydroxystaurosporine O-methyltransferase, and staurosporine synthase.

References 

 

EC 2.1.1
Enzymes of unknown structure